Concurrent MetateM is a multi-agent language in which each agent is programmed using a set of (augmented) temporal logic specifications of the behaviour it should exhibit. These specifications are executed directly to generate the behaviour of the agent. As a result, there is no risk of invalidating the logic as with systems where logical specification must first be translated to a lower-level implementation.

The root of the MetateM concept is Gabbay's separation theorem; any arbitrary temporal logic formula can be rewritten in a logically equivalent past → future form. Execution proceeds by a process of continually matching rules against a history, and firing those rules when antecedents are satisfied. Any instantiated future-time consequents become commitments which must subsequently be satisfied, iteratively generating a model for the formula made up of the program rules.

Temporal Connectives
The Temporal Connectives of Concurrent MetateM can divided into two categories, as follows:

 Strict past time connectives: '●' (weak last), '◎' (strong last), '◆' (was), '■' (heretofore), S (since), and Z (zince, or  weak since).
 Present and future time connectives: '◯' (next), '◇' (sometime), '□' (always), U (until), and W (unless).

The connectives {◎,●,◆,■,◯,◇,□} are unary; the remainder are binary.

Strict past time connectives

Weak last
●ρ is satisfied now if ρ was true in the previous time. If ●ρ is interpreted at the beginning of time, it is satisfied despite there being no actual previous time.  Hence "weak" last.

Strong last
◎ρ is satisfied now if ρ was true in the previous time.  If ◎ρ is interpreted at the beginning of time, it is not satisfied because there is no actual previous time.  Hence "strong" last.

Was
◆ρ is satisfied now if ρ was true in any previous moment in time.

Heretofore
■ρ is satisfied now if ρ was true in every previous moment in time.

Since
ρSψ is satisfied now if ψ is true at any previous moment and ρ is true at every moment after that moment.

Zince, or weak since
ρZψ is satisfied now if (ψ is true at any previous moment and ρ is true at every moment after that moment) OR ψ has not happened in the past.

Present and future time connectives

Next
◯ρ is satisfied now if ρ is true in the next moment in time.

Sometime
◇ρ is satisfied now if ρ is true now or in any future moment in time.

Always
□ρ is satisfied now if ρ is true now and in every future moment in time.

Until
ρUψ is satisfied now if ψ is true at any future moment and ρ is true at every moment prior.

Unless
ρWψ is satisfied now if (ψ is true at any future moment and ρ is true at every moment prior) OR ψ does not happen in the future.

References

External links
 A Java implementation of a MetateM interpreter can be downloaded from here

Artificial intelligence